Shuanggang may refer to the following locations in China:

 Shuanggang, Anqing (双港镇), town in Tongcheng, Anhui
 Shuanggang, Jiangsu (双港镇), town in Xiangshui County
 Shuanggang, Jiangxi (双港镇), town in Poyang County
 Shuanggang, Jilin (双岗镇), town in Tongyu County
 Shuanggang, Tianjin (双港镇), town in Jinnan District
 Shuanggang Subdistrict, Hefei (双岗街道), in Luyang District
 Shuanggang Subdistrict, Quzhou (双港街道), in Kecheng District, Quzhou, Zhejiang
 Shuanggang, Wudian, a village in Wudian, Guangshui, Suizhou, Hubei